Uali Kurzhev (born 24 April 1989) is a Russian judoka, sambo practitioner and submission grappler. He is the gold medallist of the 2015 Judo Grand Slam Tyumen in the -73 kg category, and a three-time Sambo world champion.

Career
Uali Kurzhev was born on 28 April 1989, he is from the republic of Karachay-Cherkessia.

Kurzhev is a three-time sambo world champion, having won the 74 kg title in 2011, 2012 & 2019. He also won the European Championships in 2013 and the 2013 Summer Universiade.

In Judo he won bronze at the 2014 Tyumen Grand Slam, then gold at the 2015 edition. At the 2016 Tashkent Grand Prix he won bronze, gold at the 2016 Qingdao Grand Prix, bronze at the 2017 Zagreb Grand Prix as well at the 2017 Tbilisi Grand Prix. He also won a bronze at the 2018 Ekaterinburg Grand Slam.

Competing in Submission grappling in October 2022, after he missed hydration twice and became ineligible for the inaugural ONE Grappling World Championship at ONE on Prime Video 3, Kurzhev was submitted by Kade Ruotolo with a heel hook at the 4:26 mark of the 10-minute bout.

Kurzhev was scheduled to face Tommy Langaker on 25 February 2023, at ONE Fight Night 7. Kurzhev was submitted with a heelhook at 2:58.

References

External links
 
 

1989 births
Living people
Russian male judoka